Turan is the sixth and latest album of shamanic metal band Darkestrah, released on 29 April 2016. All music composed during the years 2014 and 2015 by Darkestrah, except the introduction by Turan Ensemble, Kazakhstan.

It is the second album of Darkestrah released by Osmose Productions. It is the first album to feature the vocalist Merkith, as well.

Critical reception 

The album received 4/5 score from Metal Hammer and hailed it as being an "epic folk metal album". Angry Metal Guy gave the album 3.5 stars out of 5, however mentioned the importance of previous albums over Turan. Grim Lord from NewNoiseMagazine gave the album 4.5 stars out of 5 and praised it being an atmospheric black metal act.

Track listing

Personnel 
 Asbath – drums, percussion, temir komuz
 Resurgemus – guitars, synthesizers
 Merkith – vocals
 Cerritus – bass
 Ragnar – guitars

References 

2016 albums
Modern pagan music albums